The Philosophy of the Spiritual is an album by bassist Richard Davis recorded in 1971 and released on the Cobblestone label. The album was reissued in 1975 on the Muse label as With Understanding.

Reception
Allmusic awarded the album 4½ stars.

Track listing 
All compositions by Bill Lee except as indicated
 "Dear Old Stockholm" (Traditional) - 5:36   
 "Monica" - 4:05   
 "Oh My God" (Nadi Koma) - 9:27   
 "The Rabbi" - 7:23   
 "Baby Sweets" - 6:18   
 "Juan Valdez" - 5:02

Personnel 
Richard Davis - bass 
Chick Corea - piano
Bill Lee - bass
Sam Brown - guitar
Sonny Brown - drums
Frankie Dunlop - percussion

References 

Richard Davis (bassist) albums
1971 albums
Cobblestone Records albums
Muse Records albums
Albums produced by Larry Fallon